One Too Many is a 1951 film produced by Kroger Babb and directed by Erle C. Kenton. The film tells the story of Helen Mason (Ruth Warrick), who is slowly revealed during the course of the film to be an alcoholic, destroying her career as a concert pianist and her family in the process.

Production
The film's story author and producer was Kroger Babb, who worked primarily on making films about fringe subjects, such as the anti-drug film She Shoulda Said No (1949) and a film about the life of Jesus Christ titled The Lawton Story (1949).

Production began on the film on August 1950.

Release
One Too Many had it's world premiere on January 1, 1951 at the Murphy Theatre in Wilmington, Ohio. The manager of the theatre, Joe R. Murphy stated that the film had to be shown on January 1, at 12:01 a am as the film carries a 1951 copyright, and cannot be released before January 1. In October 1951, The Daily Variety wrote that producer Kroger Babb changed the title from One Too Many to The Best is Yet To Come as the original title "failed to attract a significant audience." The Hollywood Reporter noted in January 1955 that the film had been market-tested, but still was held back from releasing nationally and again wrote in August 1955 that the film was re-released inin 1955 under the title Mixed-Up Women.

References

External links
 

1951 films
Films directed by Erle C. Kenton
1951 drama films
American drama films
1950s educational films
American black-and-white films
1950s English-language films
1950s American films